Francisco "Paco" Gallardo León (born 13 January 1980) is a Spanish football manager and former player who played as a midfielder. He is currently the u21 manager at Leeds United.

Club career

Sevilla
Born in Seville, Andalusia, and a product of hometown club Sevilla FC's youth system, Gallardo made his first-team debut aged 20, being instrumental in their 2001 return to La Liga and proceeding to have a further two solid seasons with the main squad. In November of that year, he was fined and suspended by the Royal Spanish Football Federation for violating standards of "sporting dignity and decorum" after he congratulated teammate José Antonio Reyes, who had just scored, by a disrespectful celebration biting him.

After a relatively successful loan at Getafe CF, helping the Madrid side retain their newly acquired top division status, Gallardo's career would be very irregular: he served two unassuming loans in early 2006, starting with Vitória S.C. from Portugal, then moved in the 2006–07 campaign to Real Murcia in Segunda División, still on contract to Sevilla.

Murcia
Gallardo signed on a permanent basis prior to the start of 2007–08, but could only appear in ten league matches in an eventual relegation from the top flight. In the following season he was ousted from the squad alongside José María Movilla by manager Javier Clemente, and spent several months without a team, being reinstated in March 2009 after the coach's dismissal; he was finally released in June.

Later years
On 12 November 2009, Gallardo joined another club in the second level, SD Huesca, after a successful week's trial. He finished his career at the age of 34, after three years in Hungary with two teams.

Gallardo returned to the Ramón Sánchez Pizjuán Stadium in the summer of 2015, first being in charge of the academy and later being appointed at the helm of the amateur team in Tercera División, with Carlos Marchena as his assistant.

In November 2022 Gallardo joined Premier League side Leeds United as a 1st team coach working with Jesse Marsch. Gallardo was named co-interim head coach alongside Michael Skubala and Chris Armas following the sacking of Jesse Marsch in February. Gallardo oversaw a 2-2 draw with Manchester United

Managerial statistics

References

External links

1980 births
Living people
Footballers from Seville
Spanish footballers
Association football midfielders
La Liga players
Segunda División players
Segunda División B players
Sevilla Atlético players
Sevilla FC players
Getafe CF footballers
Deportivo de La Coruña players
Real Murcia players
SD Huesca footballers
Primeira Liga players
Vitória S.C. players
Nemzeti Bajnokság I players
Diósgyőri VTK players
Puskás Akadémia FC players
Spain youth international footballers
Spain under-21 international footballers
Spanish expatriate footballers
Expatriate footballers in Portugal
Expatriate footballers in Hungary
Spanish expatriate sportspeople in Portugal
Spanish expatriate sportspeople in Hungary
Spanish football managers
Primera Federación managers
Segunda División B managers
Tercera División managers
Sevilla Atlético managers